Giovanni's Room is a 1956 novel by James Baldwin. The book focuses on the events in the life of an American man living in Paris and his feelings and frustrations with his relationships with other men in his life, particularly an Italian bartender named Giovanni whom he meets at a Parisian gay bar.

Giovanni's Room is noteworthy for bringing complex representations of homosexuality and bisexuality to a reading public with empathy and artistry, thereby fostering a broader public discourse of issues regarding same-sex desire.

Plot
David, a young American man whose girlfriend has gone off to Spain to contemplate marriage, is left alone in Paris and begins an affair with an Italian man, Giovanni. The entire story is narrated by David during "the night which is leading me to the most terrible morning of my life," when Giovanni will be executed. Baldwin tackles social isolation, gender and sexual identity crisis, as well as conflicts of masculinity within this story of a young bisexual man navigating the public sphere in a society that rejects a core aspect of his sexuality.

Part one
David, in the South of France, is about to board a train back to Paris. His girlfriend Hella, to whom he had proposed before she went to Spain, has returned to the United States. As for Giovanni, he is about to be guillotined.

David remembers his first experience with a boy, Joey, who lived in Brooklyn. The two bonded and eventually had a sexual encounter during a sleepover. The two boys began kissing and making love. The next day, David left, and a little later he took to bullying Joey in order to feel like a real man.

David now lives with his father, who is prone to drinking, and his aunt, Ellen. The latter upbraids the father for not being a good example to his son. David's father says that all he wants is for David to become a real man. Later, David begins drinking, too, and drinks and drives once, ending up in an accident. Back home, the two men talk, and David convinces his father to let him skip college and get a job instead. He then decides to move to France to find himself.

After a year in Paris, penniless, he calls Jacques, an older homosexual acquaintance, to meet him for supper so he can ask for money. (In a prolepsis, Jacques and David meet again and discuss Giovanni's fall.) The two men go to Guillaume's gay bar. They meet Giovanni, the new bartender, at whom Jacques tries to make a pass until he gets talking with Guillaume. Meanwhile, David and Giovanni become friends. Later, they all go to a restaurant in Les Halles for breakfast. Jacques enjoins David not to be ashamed to feel love; they eat oysters and drink white wine. Giovanni recounts how he met Guillaume in a cinema; how the two men had dinner together because Giovanni wanted a free meal. He also explains that Guillaume is prone to making trouble. Later, the two men go back to Giovanni's room and they have sex.

Flashing forward again to the day of Giovanni's execution, David is in his house in the South of France. The caretaker comes round for the inventory, as he is moving out the next day. She encourages him to get married, have children, and pray.

Part two
David moves into Giovanni's small room. They broach the subject of Hella, about whom Giovanni is not worried, but who reveals the Italian's misogynistic prejudices about women and the need for men to dominate them. David then briefly describes Giovanni's room, which is always in the dark because there are no curtains and they need their own privacy.  He goes on to read a letter from his father, asking him to go back to America, but he does not want to do that. The young man walks into a sailor; David believes the sailor is a gay man, though it is unclear whether this is true or the sailor is just staring back at David.

A subsequent letter from Hella announces that she is returning in a few days, and David realizes he has to part with Giovanni soon. Setting off to prove to himself that he is not gay, David searches for a woman with whom he can have sex. He meets a slight acquaintance, Sue, in a bar and they go back to her place and have sex; he does not want to see her again and has only just had her to feel better about himself. When he returns to the room, David finds a hysterical Giovanni, who has been fired from Guillaume's bar.

Hella eventually comes back and David leaves Giovanni's room with no notice for three days. He sends a letter to his father asking for money for their marriage. The couple then runs into Jacques and Giovanni in a bookshop, which makes Hella uncomfortable because she does not like Jacques's mannerisms. After walking Hella back to her hotel room, David goes to Giovanni's room to talk; the Italian man is distressed. David thinks that they cannot have a life together and feels that he would be sacrificing his manhood if he stays with Giovanni. He leaves, but runs into Giovanni several times and is upset by the "fairy" mannerisms that he is developing and his new relationship with Jacques, who is an older and richer man. Sometime later, David finds out that Giovanni is no longer with Jacques and that he might be able to get a job at Guillaume's bar again.

The news of Guillaume's murder suddenly comes out, and Giovanni is castigated in all the newspapers. David fancies that Giovanni went back into the bar to ask for a job, going so far as to sacrifice his dignity and agree to sleep with Guillaume. He imagines that after Giovanni has compromised himself, Guillaume makes excuses for why he cannot rehire him as a bartender; in reality, they both know that Giovanni is no longer of interest to Guillaume's bar's clientele since so much of his life has been played out in public. Giovanni responds by killing Guillaume in rage. Giovanni attempts to hide, but he is discovered by the police and sentenced to death for murder. Hella and David then move to the South of France, where they discuss gender roles and Hella expresses her desire to live under a man as a woman. David, wracked with guilt over Giovanni's impending execution, leaves her and goes to Nice for a few days, where he spends his time with a sailor. Hella finds him and discovers his bisexuality, which she says she suspected all along. She bitterly decides to go back to America. The book ends with David's mental pictures of Giovanni's execution and his own guilt.

Characters
David, the protagonist and the novel's narrator. A blond American man, David spends a lot of the novel battling with his sexuality and his internalized homophobia. His mother died when he was five years old.
Hella, David's girlfriend. They met in a bar in Saint-Germain-des-Prés. She is from Minneapolis and moved to Paris to study painting, until she threw in the towel and met David by serendipity. Throughout the novel David intends to marry her.
Giovanni, a young Italian man who left his village after his girlfriend gave birth to a dead child. He works as a bartender in Guillaume's gay bar. Giovanni is the titular character whose romantic relationship with David leads them to spend a large amount of the story in his apartment. Giovanni's room itself is very dirty with rotten potatoes and wine spilled across the place.
Jacques, an old American businessman, born in Belgium. He spends money on younger men, one of whom is David. 
Guillaume, the owner of a gay bar in Paris.
The Flaming Princess, an older man who tells David inside the gay bar that Giovanni is very dangerous.
Madame Clothilde, the owner of the restaurant in Les Halles.
Pierre, a young man at the restaurant.
Yves, a tall, pockmarked young man playing the pinball machine in the restaurant.
The Caretaker in the South of France. She was born in Italy and moved to France as a child. Her husband's name is Mario; they lost all their money in the Second World War, and two of their three sons died. Their living son has a son, also named Mario.
Sue, a blonde girl from Philadelphia who comes from a rich family and with whom David has a brief and regretful sexual encounter.
David's father. His relationship with David is masked by artificial heartiness; he cannot bear to acknowledge that they are not close and he might have failed in raising his son. He married for the second time after David was grown but before the action in the novel takes place. Throughout the novel David's father sends David money to sustain himself in Paris and begs David to return to America.
Ellen, David's paternal aunt. She would read books and knit; at parties she would dress skimpily, with too much make-up on. She worried that David's father was an inappropriate influence on David's development.
Joey, a neighbor in Coney Island, Brooklyn. David's first same-sex experience was with him.
Beatrice, a woman David's father sees.
The Fairy, whom David had a relationship with in the army, and who was later discharged for being gay.

Major themes

Social alienation 
One theme of Giovanni's Room is social alienation. Susan Stryker notes that prior to writing Giovanni's Room, James Baldwin had recently emigrated to Europe and "felt that the effects of racism in the United States would never allow him to be seen simply as a writer, and he feared that being tagged as gay would mean he couldn't be a writer at all."  In Giovanni's Room, David is faced with the same type of decision; on the surface he faces a choice between his American fiancée (and value set) and his European boyfriend, but ultimately, like Baldwin, he must grapple with "being alienated by the culture that produced him."

Identity 
In keeping with the theme of social alienation, this novel also explores the topics of origin and identity. As Valerie Rohy of the University of Vermont argues, "Questions of origin and identity are central to James Baldwin’s Giovanni’s Room, a text which not only participates in the tradition of the American expatriate novel exemplified by Stein and, especially, by Henry James but which does so in relation to the African-American idiom of passing and the genre of the passing novel. As such, Giovanni’s Room poses questions of nationalism, nostalgia, and the constitution of racial and sexual subjects in terms that are especially resonant for contemporary identity politics.

Masculinity 
David grapples with insecurities pertaining to his masculinity throughout the novel. He spends much of his time comparing himself to every man he meets, ensuring that his performative masculinity allows him to "pass" while negotiating the public sphere. For David, masculinity is intertwined with sexual identity, and thus he believes that his same-sex desires act against his masculinity. Baldwin seems to direct the source of his toxic masculinity towards David's father, as he takes on many of his father's problematic traits. David craves an authority figure and blames his father's lack of authority and responsibility for many of his struggles throughout the novel. This comes to a head when David drunk-drives (a habit he assigns to his father) and is involved in an accident. When his father arrives all he can say is: "I haven't done anything wrong have I?". This ends his relationship with his father and cements his toxic masculine behaviours.

Manhood 
The phrase 'manhood' repeats throughout the book, in much the same ways that we find masculinity manifesting itself. The difference between the two themes, in this case, is that David's manhood seems to be more to do with his sexual relationships, whereas his masculinity is guided by learned public behaviours he claims to inherit from his father. The self-loathing and projecting that ensues seems to depict the final blow to a man who already had a great amount of dysphoria. Baldwin's positioning of manhood within the narrative align it also with nationhood, sexuality and all facets of performance within the public sphere. Josep Armengol linked Baldwin's description of manhood as a way of him navigating his experiences of blackness in the LGBTQ+ community, particularly when David describes his earliest same-sex encounter with a boy called Joey. In this description "black" becomes a motif for experience and his dark thoughts surrounding Joey and his body.

LGBTQ+ spaces and movement in the public sphere 
Much of the integral plot of Giovanni's Room occurs within queer spaces, with the gay bar David frequents being the catalyst that not only drives the plot, but allows it to occur. The bar acts as a mediator for David, Baldwin uses this setting to bring up much of the conflict of the novel, however, it remains a place that David returns to. Baldwin's novel is one of the most accurate portrayals of LGBTQ+ people navigating the public and private sphere of its time.  It negotiates the behaviour of publicly LGBTQ+ people alongside those who are still "closeted", like David, and how these differing perspectives have an effect on the individual as well as the community that they navigate.

Homosexuality/Bisexuality 
Sexuality is the singular, major theme of Baldwin's novel. However, he layers this reading of sexuality by making David's internal conflict not only between homosexuality and heteronormativity but also, between homosexuality and bisexuality.  This layered experience reinforces the notion that David's experience of sexuality are tied to his experience of gender norms.  He struggles with the idea that he can be attracted to people of either gender because he sees it as proof of his fragile masculinity. In creating this manifestation, Baldwin fairly accurately describes the male bisexual experience of the time, the feeling of indecisiveness and insecurity. It is this portrayal of bisexuality and the experience of bi-erasure that make Baldwin's novel particularly unique.

Question of bisexuality
Ian Young argues that the novel portrays homosexual and bisexual life in western society as uncomfortable and uncertain, respectively.  Young also points out that despite the novel's "tenderness and positive qualities" it still ends with a murder.

Recent scholarship has focused on the more precise designation of bisexuality within the novel. Several scholars have claimed that the characters can be more accurately seen as bisexual, namely David and Giovanni. As Maiken Solli claims, though most people read the characters as gay/homosexual, ". . . a bisexual perspective could be just as valuable and enlightening in understanding the book, as well as exposing the bisexual experience."

Though the novel is considered a homosexual and bisexual novel, Baldwin has on occasion stated that it was "not so much about homosexuality, it is what happens if you are so afraid that you finally cannot love anybody". The novel's protagonist, David, seems incapable of deciding between Hella and Giovanni and expresses both hatred and love for the two, though he often questions if his feelings are authentic or superficial.

Inspiration
An argument can be made that David resembles Baldwin in Paris as he left America after growing up under its racism. David, though not a victim of racism like Baldwin himself, is an American who escapes to Paris. However, when asked if the book was autobiographical in an interview in 1980, Baldwin explains he was influenced by his observations in Paris, but the novel wasn't necessarily shaped by his own experiences:

"No, it is more of a study of how it might have been or how I feel it might have been. I mean, for example, some of the people I have met. We all met in a bar, there was a blond French guy sitting at a table, he bought us drinks. And, two or three days later, I saw his face in the headlines of a Paris paper. He had been arrested and was later guillotined. That stuck in my mind."

Literary significance and criticism
Even though Baldwin states that "the sexual question and the racial question have always been entwined", in Giovanni's Room, all of the characters are white. This was a surprise for his readers, since Baldwin was primarily known by his novel Go Tell It on the Mountain, which puts emphasis on the African-American experience. Highlighting the impossibility of tackling two major issues at once in America, Baldwin stated:I certainly could not possibly have—not at that point in my life—handled the other great weight, the ‘Negro problem.’ The sexual-moral light was a hard thing to deal with. I could not handle both propositions in the same book. There was no room for it.Nathan A. Scott Jr., for example, stated that Go Tell It on the Mountain showed Baldwin's "passionate identification" with his people whereas Giovanni's Room could be considered "as a deflection, as a kind of detour." Baldwin's identity as a gay and black man was questioned by both black and white people. His masculinity was called into question, due to his apparent homosexual desire for white men – this caused him to be labelled as similar to a white woman. He was considered to be "not black enough" by his fellow race because of this, and labeled subversive by the Civil Rights Movement leaders.

Baldwin's American publisher, Knopf, suggested that he "burn" the book because the theme of homosexuality would alienate him from his readership among black people. He was told, "You cannot afford to alienate that audience. This new book will ruin your career, because you’re not writing about the same things and in the same manner as you were before, and we won’t publish this book as a favor to you." However, upon publication critics tended not to be so harsh thanks to Baldwin's standing as a writer.  Giovanni's Room was ranked number 2 on a list of the best 100 gay and lesbian novels compiled by The Publishing Triangle in 1999.

On November 5, 2019, the BBC News listed Giovanni's Room on its list of the 100 most influential novels.

The 2020 novel Swimming in the Dark by Polish writer Tomasz Jedrowski presents a fictionalized depiction of LGBTQ life in the Polish People's Republic. Citing Giovanni's Room as a major influence in his writing, Jedrowski pays homage to Baldwin by incorporating the novel into his narrative, the two main characters beginning an affair after one lends a copy of Giovanni's Room to the other.

Footnotes

References

External links

1956 American novels
Dial Press books
Novels by James Baldwin
Novels set in Paris
Novels with gay themes
1950s LGBT novels
American LGBT novels
Novels with bisexual themes
Nonlinear narrative novels
Male bisexuality in fiction